Henry C. Lattimore (February 25, 1934 – May 18, 2010) was an American football coach.  He was the 10th head football coach at Morgan State University, coaching the Bears during the 1976 and 1977 seasons. Lattimore was also the 15th head coach for the North Carolina Central University Eagles located in Durham, North Carolina and he held that position for twelve seasons, from 1979 until 1990.  His coaching record at North Carolina Central was 72–53–3.

Lattimore died on May 18, 2010 in Houston, Texas after suffering from Alzheimer's disease.

Head coaching record

References

1934 births
2010 deaths
Jackson State Tigers football coaches
Jackson State Tigers football players
Morgan State Bears football coaches
North Carolina Central Eagles football coaches
Texas Southern Tigers football coaches
Virginia Union Panthers football coaches
Sportspeople from Natchez, Mississippi
African-American coaches of American football
African-American players of American football
20th-century African-American sportspeople
21st-century African-American sportspeople